Allison Dale Burroughs (born April 25, 1961) is a United States district judge of the United States District Court for the District of Massachusetts.

Biography

Burroughs was born in 1961 in Boston, Massachusetts. She received a Bachelor of Arts degree, cum laude, from Middlebury College. She received a Juris Doctor, cum laude, in 1988 from the University of Pennsylvania Law School. She began her legal career as a law clerk for Judge Norma Levy Shapiro of the United States District Court for the Eastern District of Pennsylvania from 1988 to 1989. She served as an Assistant United States Attorney in the Eastern District of Pennsylvania from 1989 to 1995 and in the District of Massachusetts from 1995 to 2005. From 2005 to 2014 she was a partner at Nutter McClennen & Fish where she represented individuals and corporations in criminal and civil proceedings primarily before Federal Courts.

Federal judicial service

On July 31, 2014, President Barack Obama nominated Burroughs to serve as a United States District Judge of the United States District Court for the District of Massachusetts, to the seat vacated by Judge Rya W. Zobel, who assumed senior status on April 1, 2014. She received a hearing before the United States Senate Committee on the Judiciary on September 17, 2014. On November 20, 2014, her nomination was reported out of committee by voice vote. On December 13, 2014, Senate Majority Leader Harry Reid filed a motion to invoke cloture on the nomination. On December 16, 2014, Reid withdrew his cloture motion on Burroughs' nomination, and the Senate proceeded to confirm Burroughs by a voice vote. She received her federal judicial commission on December 19, 2014, and was sworn in on January 7, 2015.

Notable rulings 

Judge Burroughs is most notable for her order putting a hold on President Donald Trump's travel ban in January 2017 (Executive Order 13769), and as the judge who presided over United States v. Salemme, Students for Fair Admissions v. Harvard University, and United States v. Babich.  Salemme was the last major trial of La Cosa Nostra mobsters.  Francis Salemme (aka "Cadillac Frank") and co-defendant Paul Weadick were convicted of the murder of 43-year-old Steven A. DiSarro, who disappeared in May 1993.  Salemme and Weadick were sentenced to life in prison in September 2018.  In October 2018, Burroughs held a three-week bench trial in SFFA v. Harvard, a lawsuit challenging Harvard's admissions program as discriminatory against Asian Americans.   A decision in favor of the university was announced on October 1, 2019. United States v. Babich is a criminal case brought against several former executives of the pharmaceutical company Insys Therapeutics.  The government alleged that the executives violated the Racketeer Influenced and Corrupt Organizations Act (RICO), 18 U.S.C. 1692 et seq., by engaging in a scheme to sell the fentanyl-based pain medication Subsys by bribing physicians to prescribe the drug.  The indictments led to guilty pleas, including by former Insys CEO Michael Babich.  The remaining defendants were tried from January through April 2019. All five remaining defendants, including former billionaire John Kapoor, were convicted of racketeering.

Judge Burroughs also presided over a July 2020 lawsuit filed by Harvard and the Massachusetts Institute of Technology (MIT) that sought to halt an Immigration and Customs Enforcement (ICE) policy that required international students in the United States on F-1 visas to depart the country if they would not be attending in-person classes during the COVID-19 pandemic.  Judge Burroughs announced that the Trump administration had agreed to reverse the policy during a July 14, 2020 hearing in her Boston courtroom.

In December 2020, Judge Burroughs presided over a lawsuit brought by five Republicans who lost state and federal legislative races in Massachusetts and sought to overturn the election results.  Judge Burroughs stated during a December 2020 hearing that she viewed the lawsuit's requested relief of invalidating the votes of millions of Massachusetts resident as “too late,” “misplaced,” and “terribly unfair.” 

Judge Burroughs has also presided over several class actions related to consumer products, including the In re Intuniv Antitrust Litigation, which concerns allegedly anticompetitive agreements between drug makers Shire and Actavis purportedly aimed at charging supracompetitive prices for an ADHD medication, and cases against each of Nestle, The Hershey Company, and Mars alleging that the companies violated Massachusetts law by failing to disclose the use of slave labor in their cocoa bean supply lines.  Judge Burroughs' In re Intuniv Antitrust Litigation class certification opinions (one opinion certifying a class of direct purchasers, and another declining to certify a class of indirect, consumer purchasers) are notable for their application of the predominance required for class certification where putative classes contain numerous uninjured members.  Judge Burroughs dismissed the complaints against the chocolate bar companies in January 2019, a decision upheld by the Court of Appeals for the First Circuit in June 2020. In September 2019, Burroughs also dismissed a class action suit that claimed the packaging of Honey Bunches of Oats cereal was misleading given the cereal's limited honey content.

In a February 2020 decision, Judge Burroughs ordered the release of certain grand jury materials related to the Pentagon Papers.

See also 
 List of Jewish American jurists
 Students for Fair Admissions v. President and Fellows of Harvard College

References

External links

1961 births
Living people
American women lawyers
Jewish American attorneys
Assistant United States Attorneys
Judges of the United States District Court for the District of Massachusetts
Massachusetts lawyers
Middlebury College alumni
Pennsylvania lawyers
Lawyers from Boston
United States district court judges appointed by Barack Obama
21st-century American judges
University of Pennsylvania Law School alumni
21st-century American women judges